The Rage: Original Motion Picture Soundtrack was both the ninth album and first movie soundtrack by the band Midnight Syndicate, released February 26, 2008.  The album features the score to the 2007 horror film, The Rage, composed by Edward Douglas.

Background and release 
After leaving the KNB EFX Group in 2003, Rage, director, Robert Kurtzman moved to Ohio to form Precinct 13 Entertainment. In a 2010 interview, Kurtzman said: When I came to Ohio, I wanted to get The Rage going and I wanted to make it in Ohio with as many Ohioans as I could. I had some of their (Midnight Syndicate) CDs, that I had picked up at conventions. Someone told me that Ed (Douglas) and his partner lived in Cleveland. I called them up and asked them if they wanted to be involved with our independent movie. That is really how the relationship started. At that point, Midnight Syndicate had a well-established reputation in the Halloween/horror music, haunted attraction, and gaming industries having released eight albums that featured a blending of instrumental symphonic music and soundscape. Daniel Hinds of Outburn Music Magazine said that, given their previous work, it made "perfect sense" for them to "feel right at home" scoring movie soundtracks. The album was released and distributed through Entity Productions, one of the largest distributor of Halloween music CDs at the time.

Reception 
Dread Central praised the soundtrack calling it "a rare piece of music where the sound defines the picture" noting homages to Brad Fiedel's Terminator soundtrack and Goblin's Dawn of the Dead (1978). Daniel Hinds of Outburn called the soundtrack "surprisingly well rounded" and "larger than life" adding that while, because the pacing and arrangement of the album were tied to the film, it "might not be as satisfying as a spin of one of Midnight Syndicate's independent albums," it still made for a "gripping" listen that should "fit nicely next to your John Carpenter soundtracks."

Track listing

Personnel 
Edward Douglas – composer

Production 
Producer – Edward Douglas
Album Producers - Midnight Syndicate
Mastering – Gavin Goszka
Design - Brainstorm Studios
Photography - Precinct 13 Entertainment

References

Midnight Syndicate soundtracks
2008 soundtrack albums
Horror film soundtracks